

Atlantic League records

Championship series
See: Atlantic League of Professional Baseball#Championship Series

All-star game
See: Atlantic League of Professional Baseball#All-Star Games

Longest game

On Tuesday, September 13, 2006, the Long Island Ducks and the Camden Riversharks played an 18-inning ballgame that set the league record for the longest game in Atlantic League history.

After the Ducks tied the score at five in the eighth inning, the game would progress another six frames before another run would cross the plate. Both clubs put up a two-spot in the 15th inning before Camden would score the game-winning run in the 18th, six hours and 20 minutes after the game began.

The 18-inning contest was the longest game played in the Atlantic League's history in both innings and time elapsed. During the contest, the teams combined for 34 hits, two doubles, a triple and three home runs, while the pitching staffs combined for 39 strikeouts (LGI 22, CA 17). During the game, fielders Jason Conti, Richie Barrett and Matt Demarco took the hill for the Riversharks. Conti picked up the win in his first career appearance on the hill after hurling three scoreless innings of relief.

Atlantic League final standings

1998

Member teams
Atlantic City Surf
Bridgeport Bluefish
Nashua Pride
Newark Bears
Newburgh Black Diamonds
Somerset Patriots

First Half

Second Half

1999

Member teams
Atlantic City Surf
Bridgeport Bluefish
Lehigh Valley Black Diamonds
Nashua Pride
Newark Bears
Somerset Patriots

First Half

Second Half

2000

Member teams
Atlantic City Surf
Aberdeen Arsenal
Bridgeport Bluefish
Lehigh Valley Black Diamonds
Long Island Ducks
Nashua Pride
Newark Bears
Somerset Patriots

First Half

Second Half

2001

Member teams
Atlantic City Surf
Bridgeport Bluefish
Camden Riversharks
Lehigh Valley Black Diamonds
Long Island Ducks
Nashua Pride
Newark Bears
Somerset Patriots

First Half

Second Half

2002

Member teams
Atlantic City Surf
Bridgeport Bluefish
Camden Riversharks
Long Island Ducks
Nashua Pride
Newark Bears
Pennsylvania Road Warriors
Somerset Patriots

First Half

Second Half

2003

Member teams
Atlantic City Surf
Bridgeport Bluefish
Camden Riversharks
Long Island Ducks
Nashua Pride
Newark Bears
Pennsylvania Road Warriors
Somerset Patriots

First Half

Second Half

2004

Member teams
Atlantic City Surf
Bridgeport Bluefish
Camden Riversharks
Long Island Ducks
Nashua Pride
Newark Bears
Pennsylvania Road Warriors
Somerset Patriots

First Half

Second Half

2005

Member teams
Atlantic City Surf
Bridgeport Bluefish
Camden Riversharks
Lancaster Barnstormers
Long Island Ducks
Nashua Pride
Newark Bears
Somerset Patriots

First Half

Second Half

2006

Member teams
Atlantic City Surf
Bridgeport Bluefish
Camden Riversharks
Lancaster Barnstormers
Long Island Ducks
Newark Bears
Road Warriors
Somerset Patriots

First Half

Second Half

2007

Member teams
Bridgeport Bluefish
Camden Riversharks
Lancaster Barnstormers
Long Island Ducks
Newark Bears
Road Warriors
Somerset Patriots
York Revolution

First Half

Second Half

2008

Member teams
Bridgeport Bluefish
Camden Riversharks
Lancaster Barnstormers
Long Island Ducks
Newark Bears
Somerset Patriots
Southern Maryland Blue Crabs
York Revolution

First Half

Second Half

2009

Member teams
Bridgeport Bluefish
Camden Riversharks
Lancaster Barnstormers
Long Island Ducks
Newark Bears
Somerset Patriots
Southern Maryland Blue Crabs
York Revolution

First Half

Second Half

2010

Member teams
Bridgeport Bluefish
Camden Riversharks
Lancaster Barnstormers
Long Island Ducks
Newark Bears
Somerset Patriots
Southern Maryland Blue Crabs
York Revolution

First Half

Second Half

2011

Member teams
Bridgeport Bluefish
Camden Riversharks
Lancaster Barnstormers
Long Island Ducks
Road Warriors
Somerset Patriots
Southern Maryland Blue Crabs
York Revolution

First Half

Second Half

2012

Member teams
Bridgeport Bluefish
Camden Riversharks
Lancaster Barnstormers
Long Island Ducks
Somerset Patriots
Southern Maryland Blue Crabs
Sugar Land Skeeters
York Revolution

First Half

Second Half

2013

Member teams
Bridgeport Bluefish
Camden Riversharks
Lancaster Barnstormers
Long Island Ducks
Somerset Patriots
Southern Maryland Blue Crabs
Sugar Land Skeeters
York Revolution

2014

Member teams
Bridgeport Bluefish
Camden Riversharks
Lancaster Barnstormers
Long Island Ducks
Somerset Patriots
Southern Maryland Blue Crabs
Sugar Land Skeeters
York Revolution

2015

Member teams
Bridgeport Bluefish
Camden Riversharks
Lancaster Barnstormers
Long Island Ducks
Somerset Patriots
Southern Maryland Blue Crabs
Sugar Land Skeeters
York Revolution

2016

Member teams
Bridgeport Bluefish
Lancaster Barnstormers
Long Island Ducks
New Britain Bees
Somerset Patriots
Southern Maryland Blue Crabs
Sugar Land Skeeters
York Revolution

2017

Member teams
Bridgeport Bluefish
Lancaster Barnstormers
Long Island Ducks
New Britain Bees
Somerset Patriots
Southern Maryland Blue Crabs
Sugar Land Skeeters
York Revolution

2018

Member teams
Lancaster Barnstormers
Long Island Ducks
New Britain Bees
Road Warriors
Somerset Patriots
Southern Maryland Blue Crabs
Sugar Land Skeeters
York Revolution

2019

Member teams
High Point Rockers
Lancaster Barnstormers
Long Island Ducks
New Britain Bees
Somerset Patriots
Southern Maryland Blue Crabs
Sugar Land Skeeters
York Revolution

First Half

Second Half

2020 (Did not play due to COVID-19 pandemic)

Member teams
High Point Rockers
Lancaster Barnstormers
Long Island Ducks
Road Warriors
Somerset Patriots
Southern Maryland Blue Crabs
Sugar Land Skeeters
York Revolution

2021

Member teams
Gastonia Honey Hunters
High Point Rockers
Lancaster Barnstormers
Lexington Legends
Long Island Ducks
Southern Maryland Blue Crabs
West Virginia Power
York Revolution

2022

Member teams
Charleston Dirty Birds
Gastonia Honey Hunters
High Point Rockers
Lancaster Barnstormers
Lexington Legends
Long Island Ducks
Southern Maryland Blue Crabs
Staten Island Harbor Heroes
York Revolution

Former teams
See: Atlantic League of Professional Baseball#Former teams

References

Sources
 Atlantic League of Professional Baseball
 Atlantic League Baseball
 Atlantic League information

Minor league baseball records
Atlantic League of Professional Baseball